Willie Aaron Anderson (born July 11, 1975) is a former American football player who was an offensive tackle for the Cincinnati Bengals and Baltimore Ravens of the National Football League (NFL).  He played college football for Auburn University.  He was drafted by the Bengals 10th overall in the 1996 NFL Draft.  A four-time Pro Bowler and three-time First-team All-Pro selection, Anderson played his first 12 seasons with the Bengals. 

He was the first right tackle to be named a First-team All-Pro in three straight seasons since Dan Dierdorf, Ron Yary, and Rayfield Wright all did it in the 1970s, and the first right tackle to be named to the Pro Bowl in four straight seasons since Jackie Slater; no right tackle has accomplished those feats since Anderson. 

In 2021, Willie Anderson was inducted into the Alabama Sports Hall of Fame. 

That following year, he became a member of the Ring of Honor induction class of 2022 for the Bengals, joining Paul Brown, Anthony Munoz, Ken Anderson and Ken Riley.

Anderson has a son, Jair Hawkins-Anderson, who played college football at Georgia Tech.

He trains offensive linemen from high school to the NFL at the Willie Anderson Lineman Academy.

College career
Anderson attended Auburn University, where he played for the Auburn Tigers football team from 1993 to 1995.  He majored in marketing education.

Anderson started as a freshman at guard during the Tigers undefeated season in 1993. He switched to offensive tackle the next year.

He was honored as a 2nd-Team All-American after his Junior year at Auburn.

Professional career

Cincinnati Bengals

Anderson was selected by the Cincinnati Bengals in the first round (10th overall) of the 1996 NFL Draft. He made Dr. Z's Sports Illustrated All-Pro team in 1999 and was a first alternate to the Pro Bowl in the 2001 and 2002 seasons. He was selected to represent the AFC in the 2003, 2004, 2005, and 2006 Pro Bowl.

Anderson was a road-grading run blocker, helping Corey Dillon break two NFL rushing records: Jim Brown’s rookie single-game rushing record and Walter Payton’s single-game rushing record of 275 yards. He also helped Rudi Johnson break the Bengals single-season rushing record that still stands today. He started 116 consecutive games in a row from 1999 to 2007.

In his rookie season, it was said that he was able to bench press 675 pounds. Anderson received a five-year, $30 million contract extension after the 1999 season, his fourth season. He also received a five-year, $32 million contract extension, with $20 million guaranteed, prior to the 2006 season, his eleventh season with the Bengals.

In 2017, Anderson was named by the Bengals as one of their top 50 players to celebrate their 50th season.

Baltimore Ravens

Anderson was cut by the Bengals on August 30, 2008 after he refused to take a pay cut. He then signed a three-year, $11 million deal with the Baltimore Ravens. Anderson started 10 games for the Ravens, helping them reach the AFC Championship Game in coach John Harbaugh’s first season.

On May 13, 2009, the Ravens placed him on the reserved-retired list. The Ravens asked Anderson to reconsider his retirement, but he retired after the 2008 season.

References

External links
Baltimore Ravens bio 

1975 births
Living people
Sportspeople from Mobile, Alabama
American football offensive tackles
Auburn Tigers football players
Cincinnati Bengals players
Baltimore Ravens players
American Conference Pro Bowl players
Players of American football from Alabama
Vigor High School alumni
Ed Block Courage Award recipients